Corimelaena is a genus of ebony bugs in the family Thyreocoridae. There are at least 20 described species in Corimelaena.

Species
These 20 species belong to the genus Corimelaena:

 Corimelaena agrella Mcatee, 1919 i c g b
 Corimelaena alpina (McAtee and Malloch, 1933) i c g
 Corimelaena barberi (McAtee and Malloch, 1933) i c g
 Corimelaena californica Van Duzee, 1929 i c g
 Corimelaena cognata (Van Duzee, 1907) i c g
 Corimelaena contrasta (McAtee and Malloch, 1933) i c g
 Corimelaena extensa Uhler, 1863 i c g
 Corimelaena feminea (McAtee and Malloch, 1933) i c g
 Corimelaena harti Malloch, 1919 i c g
 Corimelaena incognita (Mcatee & Malloch, 1933) i c g b
 Corimelaena interrupta Malloch, 1919 i c g
 Corimelaena lateralis (Fabricius, 1803) i c g b
 Corimelaena marginella Dallas, 1851 i c g
 Corimelaena minuta Uhler, 1863 i c g
 Corimelaena minutissima Malloch, 1919 i c g
 Corimelaena nigra Dallas, 1851 i c g
 Corimelaena obscura Mcpherson & Sailer, 1978 i c g b
 Corimelaena polita Malloch, 1919 i c g
 Corimelaena pulicaria (Germar, 1839) i c g b (black bug)
 Corimelaena virilis (McAtee and Malloch, 1933) i c g

Data sources: i = ITIS, c = Catalogue of Life, g = GBIF, b = Bugguide.net

References

Further reading

External links

 

Shield bugs
Articles created by Qbugbot
Pentatomomorpha genera